Henry O. "Hammerin' Hank" Nichols (born July 20, 1936) is an American college basketball referee and later supervisor of officials. In 2012, he was inducted as a member of the Naismith Memorial Basketball Hall of Fame. Nichols is also a member of the Philadelphia Big 5 Hall of Fame, Villanova Athletic Hall of Fame, the Philadelphia Athletic Hall of Fame, the Greater Buffalo Sports Hall of Fame, and the Pennsylvania Sports Hall of Fame. He officiated 10 National Collegiate Athletic Association(NCAA)Final Fours, a record 6 NCAA Men's Basketball National Championships, 3 NIT Finals, 2 Olympic Games and 1 European Championships. He was also the first official to work with both the NIT and NCAA Championship Basketball Finals in a single year, and the first National Coordinator of Officials. Since 2004, he has worked as an Umpire Observer for Major League Baseball.

Early life
Nichols grew up in Niagara Falls, New York.  In high school, he attended Bishop Duffy High and lettered in three sports. He earned a scholarship to Villanova University, where he played catcher. He also started on the freshman basketball team.

After graduation, Nichols spent two years in the Marine Corps, followed by three years playing minor league baseball in the Cincinnati Reds organization. In his last season (at age 27), he hit .330 as a player-manager in the Western Carolina League.

Officiating career
In the fall of 1969, while at Duke, Nichols started his officiating career with six freshman Atlantic Coast Conference (ACC) basketball games.  In 1970, Nichols became assistant professor in the Department of Education and Human Services at Villanova, where he would remain for the next 33 years.  He also began officiating varsity games in the ECAC and the ACC.

In 1974, Nichols worked his first NCAA tournament, the first of 13 in a row. That season, Nichols was one of the officials for the 1974 North Carolina State-Maryland ACC championship game.  Nichols said that game was the best he ever worked, and NC State's David Thompson as the greatest player he officiated. NC State won the game in overtime, and went on to win the national championship.  At the time only one team from each conference made the NCAA Tournament. 

"I just remember getting out of everybody's way," Nichols said. "Those players were so good. We just kind of watched them. It was a magnificent game."

In 1975, Nichols worked the first of 10 Final Fours, and the first of six national championships. The championship game was John Wooden's final game as the head coach at UCLA.

In 1976, he officiated at the Olympic Games in Montreal, the first of two Olympic assignments.  His second would come in 1984 in Los Angeles.

NCAA National Coordinator of Officials
In 1987, Nichols became the first NCAA coordinator of officials. He spent 22 years in that position.  Nichols said, "the goal was to try to get guys across the country to officiate the same way, not have the ACC be different from the Big Ten and the Big Ten different from the Pac-10. We wanted to teach guys to ref better, to try to get them to be more consistent. We didn't want them to be another factor when teams played on the road. We wanted them to stand tall and figure out tough situations. I think a lot of that has been accomplished." While in this position, Nichols also was the secretary/editor of the Basketball Rules Committee from 1991 to 1997.

Nichols retired after the 2007–2008 season.  He was replaced by John Adams.

References

1936 births
Living people
Baseball catchers
Baseball players from New York (state)
College men's basketball referees in the United States
Duke University alumni 
Naismith Memorial Basketball Hall of Fame inductees
Sportspeople from Niagara Falls, New York
United States Marines
Villanova Wildcats baseball players

Villanova University faculty